John William Allen (January 15, 1926 – September 16, 2006) was an American racewalker. He competed in the men's 50 kilometres walk at the 1960 Summer Olympics.

Allen also served in the United States Navy during World War II as a radio operator on a ship in the Pacific.

References

External links
 

1926 births
2006 deaths
Athletes (track and field) at the 1960 Summer Olympics
American male racewalkers
Olympic track and field athletes of the United States
Place of birth missing
United States Navy personnel of World War II
United States Navy sailors
Track and field athletes from Buffalo, New York